Rónadh Cox (born 1962) is an Irish geologist who is the Edward Brust Professor of Geology and Mineralogy at Williams College, Massachusetts. Her research considers the impact of storms on coastal boulders. She is a Fellow of the Geological Society of America and Future Earth Costs.

Early life and education
Cox is from Ireland. She says she became interested in geology as a teenager, because her geography teacher "delighted in the natural world,". She attended University College Dublin for her undergraduate degree, where she majored in geology. After earning her bachelor's degree, Cox moved to BP, where she worked as a geological assistant. She moved to the United States for her graduate research, joining Stanford University as a doctoral student. After earning her doctorate, Cox was appointed to the Rand Afrikaans University as a postdoctoral researcher. She spent two years in South Africa before returning to North America.

Research and career
Cox joined the faculty at Williams College in 1996, and was eventually promoted to Edward Brust Professor of Geology and Mineralogy. In 2019 she was concurrently appointed a Visiting Professor in the School of Earth Sciences at UCD.

Cox's research considers how storm waves move boulders. She has studied the impact of strong storms (some equivalent to category 3 hurricanes) on Ireland's west coast, with focus on the Aran Islands. In particular, she showed that 2013-14 Atlantic winter storms in Europe moved numerous hundred-tonne boulders, so-called 'megagravel' the largest ever dislocated by the waves of storms. Her team also demonstrated formation of new boulders quarried from bedrock by wave action, well above sea level. In 2020, she was awarded a new grant from the National Science Foundation to study the dynamic evolution of boulder beaches.

From 2012 to 2016, Cox served as editor of the journal Geology, and went on to serve on the editorial board.

Awards and honours
2013 Elected Fellow of the Geological Society of America
2020 Appointed Fellow of Future Earth Coasts
2020 EU Atlantic Strategy Atlantic Project Award
2020 Distinguished Service Award of the Geological Society of America
2021 Elected to the Royal Irish Academy

Selected publications

Personal life
Whilst a doctoral student in California, Cox met her husband, Mark Brandriss.

References

1962 births
Living people
20th-century Irish geologists
Fellows of the Geological Society of America
Williams College faculty
Alumni of University College Dublin
Coastal erosion
Irish women geologists
21st-century Irish geologists
Members of the Royal Irish Academy